This article lists political parties in Czechoslovakia (1918–1992).

Political parties

Major political parties in the First Czechoslovak Republic (1918–1938)
Republican Party of Farmers and Peasants (RSZML)
Communist Party of Czechoslovakia (KSČ)
Czechoslovak People's Party (ČSL)
Czechoslovak Social Democratic Workers' Party (ČSDSD)
German Social Democratic Workers' Party (DSAP)
Czechoslovak National Social Party (ČSNS)
Czechoslovak Traders' Party (ČŽOS)
Czechoslovak National Democracy (ČsND)
Hlinka's Slovak People's Party (HSĽS)
Farmers' League (BdL)
Sudeten German Party (SdP)
Slovak National and Peasant Party (SNS)
National Fascist Community (NOF)
German Electoral Coalition
National Unification (NSj)

Minor parties
Autonomous Agrarian Union
Carpathian German Party (KdP)
Carpatho-Russian Labour Party of Small Peasants and Landless
Communist Party of Czechoslovakia (German Division)
Communist Party of Czechoslovakia (Leninists)
Czechoslovak Agrarian and Conservative Party
German Christian Social People's Party
German National Party (DNP)
German National Socialist Workers' Party (DNSAP)
German Traders' Party
Hungarian National Party
Hungarian-German Social Democratic Party
Independent Socialist Workers Party
Independent Radical Social Democratic Party
Jewish Conservative Party
Jewish Economic Party
Jewish Republican Party
Jewish Party
Juriga's Slovak People's Party
Marxist Left in Slovakia and the Transcarpathian Ukraine
National Labour Party (1925)
National People's Party (NSL)
Party of Moderate Progress Within the Bounds of Law
Polish People's Party (PSL)
Polish Socialist Workers Party (PSPR)
Provincial Christian-Socialist Party (OKSZP)
United Hungarian Party
Russian National Autonomous Party
Russian National Party
Ruthenian Peasants Party
Silesian People's Party
Social Democratic Workers' Party in Subcarpathian Rus'
Socialist Association
Socialist League of the New East
Socialist Party of the Czechoslovak Working People
Sudeten German Rural League
Vlajka
Zipser German Party

Political parties created in the Second Czechoslovak Republic (1938–1939)
German People's Group in Czecho-Slovakia
National Labour Party (1938) (NSP)
Party of National Unity (SNJ)

Political parties created in the Third Czechoslovak Republic (1944–1948)
Democratic Party (DS)
Communist Party of Slovakia (KSS)
Freedom Party (SS)
Labour Party (SP)

Political parties in Communist Czechoslovakia (1948–1989)
National Front of Czechs and Slovaks
Communist Party of Czechoslovakia (KSČ)
Communist Party of Slovakia (KSS)
Czechoslovak People's Party (ČSL)
Czechoslovak Socialist Party (ČSS)
Freedom Party (SS)
Party of Slovak Revival (SSO)
 Club of Committed Non-Party Members (1968)

Political parties created in the Czech and Slovak Federative Republic (1989–1992)
Civic Democratic Party (Czech Republic) (ODS)
Civic Democratic Party (Slovakia) (ODS)
Christian Democratic Party (KDS)
Christian Democratic Movement (KDH)
Civic Forum (OF)
Civic Movement (OH)
Civic Democratic Alliance (ODA)
Conservative Party (KS)
Club of Committed Non-Party Members (KAN)
Christian and Democratic Union (KDU)
Movement for a Democratic Slovakia (HZDS)
Friends of Beer Party (SPP)
Public Against Violence (VPN)
Civic Democratic Union (ODÚ)
Party of the Democratic Left (Slovakia) (SDĽ)
Party of the Democratic Left (Czech Republic) (SDL)
Peasants' Party of Slovakia (RSS)
Pensioners' Movement for Life Security (HDŽJ)
Liberal-Social Union (LSU)
Rally for the Republic – Republican Party of Czechoslovakia (SPR–RSČ)
Communist Party of Bohemia and Moravia (KSČM)
Communist Party of Slovakia (KSS)
Union of Communists of Slovakia (ZKS)
Communist Party of Slovakia – 91 (KSS '91)
Coexistence (political party)
The Czech Crown (Monarchist Party of Bohemia, Moravia and Silesia) (KČ)
Hungarian Christian Democratic Movement (MKDM)
Hungarian Civic Party (MOS)
Green Party (Czech Republic) (SZ)
Green Party (Slovakia) (SZ)
Association of Radicals for the United States of Europe (AR)
Masaryk Democratic Party (MDS)
Movement for Autonomous Democracy–Party for Moravia and Silesia (HSD–SMS)
Slovak National Party (SNS)
Democratic Labour Party (DSP)
Liberal Democratic Party (LDS)
Party of Moravian Countryside (SMV)
Moravian-Silesian Movement (MSH)
Moravian Civic Movement (MOH)
Moravian National Party (MNS)
Czechoslovak Social Democracy (ČSSD)
Social Democratic Party of Slovakia (SDSS)
Roma Civic Initiative (ROI)

References

See also
List of political parties in the Czech Republic 
List of political parties in Slovakia

Czechoslovakia
Politics of Czechoslovakia
Political parties
Czechoslovakia

Political parties